The 564th Volksgrenadier Division was a volksgrenadier division of the German Army  during the Second World War, active from 1944 to 1945.

The division was formed in September 1944 in Austria, by redesignating the 564th Grenadier Division, under the command of Wolfgang Lange. It contained the 1150th, 1151st and 1152nd Grenadier Regiments, and the 1564th Artillery Regiment.

Notes

References

5*564
Military units and formations established in 1944
Military units and formations disestablished in 1945